Kronstadt is a port city in Kronshtadtsky District, St. Petersburg, Russia.

Kronstadt may also refer to:

Places 
 Brașov, a city in Romania, originally a Saxon citadel known as Kronstadt
 Kunštát, a settlement in Orlické Záhoří, Czech Republic, formerly known as Kronstadt
 Kroonstad, a town in South Africa
 Cronstadt Island, in Trinidad and Tobago

Other 
 Kronshtadt-class battlecruiser, a class of battlecruisers that were never completed
 Kronstadt, a Soviet Sverdlov-class cruiser that was never completed
 Kronstadt, a Soviet Kresta II-class cruiser

See also 
 Kronstadt rebellion, a 1921 incident in Kronstadt